The Erechthiinae are a subfamily of moth of the family Tineidae.

Genera
 Anastathma
 Callicerastis (sometimes in Erechthias)
 Comodica
 Erechthias Meyrick, 1880
 Mecomodica (sometimes in Comodica or Erechthias)
 Petula
 Phthinocola
 Pisistrata
 Pontodryas
 Thuriostoma

References
 Meyrick, 1880. Proc. Linn. Soc. N.S.W. (1), 5: 255. 

 , 1994: Erechthiinae (Lepidoptera, Tineidae) of Japan. Japanese journal of entomology 62(3): 565-584. Full article: